The La Courneuve Flash are a French American football team based in La Courneuve, France. The team plays in Ligue Élite de Football Américain and in the European Football League.

History
The La Courneuve Flash were established on February 4, 1984.

Championships

Ligue Élite
Ligue Élite championships
The Flash are eleven-time Ligue Élite champions having won the championship in 1997, 2000, 2003, 2005, 2006, 2007, 2008, 2009, 2011, 2017, 2018 and 2022.

Ligue Élite runners up
The Flash are five-time Ligue Élite runners up having made the championship game in 1998, 2001, 2002, 2010 and 2013.

European Football League
European Football League runners up
The Flash are three-time European Football League runners up having made the championship game in 1998, 2006 and 2009.

References

External links
 Official website

American football teams in France
Sport in Seine-Saint-Denis
1984 establishments in France
American football teams established in 1984